Sam Barkley (born 28 March 1999 in Northern Ireland) is an combined Irish international lawn and indoor bowler.

Bowls career
Barkley made his indoor bowling debut for Ireland in 2016. In 2020, he won the Junior singles at the British Isles Indoor Championships.

He made his debut at the World Championships during the 2021 World Indoor Bowls Championship competing in the singles and pairs. In 2021, he became a National champion after winning the pairs with Martin McHugh at the Irish National Bowls Championships.

In 2022, he competed in the men's pairs and the men's fours at the 2022 Commonwealth Games. In the fours the team of Barkley, Adam McKeown, Ian McClure and Martin McHugh won the gold medal defeating India in the final.

Personal life
He is a plumber by trade.

A member of the Orange Institution, he won the 2023 Orange "Sporting Achievement Award".

References

1999 births
Living people
Irish male lawn bowls players
Male lawn bowls players from Northern Ireland
Commonwealth Games competitors for Northern Ireland
Bowls players at the 2022 Commonwealth Games
Commonwealth Games gold medallists for Northern Ireland
Commonwealth Games medallists in lawn bowls
Medallists at the 2022 Commonwealth Games